The Battle of Karbala was fought on 10 October 680 (10 Muharram in the year 61 AH of the Islamic calendar) between the army of the second Umayyad Caliph Yazid I and a small army led by Husayn ibn Ali, the grandson of the Islamic prophet Muhammad, at Karbala, Sawad (modern-day southern Iraq).

Prior to his death, the Umayyad caliph Muawiyah I had nominated his son Yazid as his successor. Yazid's nomination was contested by the sons of a few prominent companions of Muhammad, including Husayn, son of the fourth caliph Ali, and Abd Allah ibn Zubayr, son of Zubayr ibn al-Awwam. Upon Muawiyah's death in 680 CE, Yazid demanded allegiance from Husayn and other dissidents. Husayn did not give allegiance and traveled to Mecca. The people of Kufa, an Iraqi garrison town and the center of Ali's caliphate, were averse to the Syria-based Umayyad caliphs and had a long-standing attachment to the house of Ali. They proposed Husayn overthrow the Umayyads. On Husayn's way to Kufa with a retinue of about 70 men, his caravan was intercepted by a 1,000-strong army of the caliph at some distance from Kufa. He was forced to head north and encamp in the plain of Karbala on 2 October, where a larger Umayyad army of 4,000 arrived soon afterwards. Negotiations failed after the Umayyad governor Ubayd Allah ibn Ziyad refused Husayn safe passage without submitting to his authority, a condition declined by Husayn. Battle ensued on 10 October during which Husayn was killed along with most of his relatives and companions, while his surviving family members were taken prisoner. The battle was followed by the Second Fitna, during which the Iraqis organized two separate campaigns to avenge the death of Husayn; the first one by the Tawwabin and the other one by Mukhtar al-Thaqafi and his supporters.

The Battle of Karbala galvanized the development of the pro-Alid party (Shi'at Ali) into a unique religious sect with its own rituals and collective memory. It has a central place in Shi'a history, tradition, and theology, and has frequently been recounted in Shi'a literature. For the Shi'a, Husayn's suffering and death became a symbol of sacrifice in the struggle for right against wrong, and for justice and truth against injustice and falsehood. It also provides the members of the Shi'a faith with a catalog of heroic norms. The battle is commemorated during an annual ten-day period during the Islamic month of Muharram by Shi'a, culminating on tenth day of the month, known as the Day of Ashura. On this day, Shi'a Muslims mourn, hold public processions, organize religious gathering, beat their chests and in some cases self-flagellate. Sunni Muslims likewise regard the incident as a historical tragedy; Husayn and his companions are widely regarded as martyrs by both Sunni and Shi'a Muslims.

Political background

After the third caliph Uthman's assassination by rebels in 656, the rebels and the townspeople of Medina declared Ali, a cousin and son-in-law of the Islamic prophet Muhammad, caliph. Some of Muhammad's companions including Talha ibn Ubayd Allah, Zubayr ibn al-Awwam and Mu'awiya ibn Abi Sufyan (then governor of Syria), and Muhammad's widow A'isha, refused to recognize Ali. They called for revenge against Uthman's killers and the election of a new caliph through shura (consultation). These events precipitated the First Fitna (First Muslim Civil War). When Ali was assassinated by Abd-al-Rahman ibn Muljam, a Kharijite, in 661, his eldest son Hasan succeeded him but soon signed a peace treaty with Mu'awiya to avoid further bloodshed. In the treaty, Hasan was to hand over power to Mu'awiya on the condition that Mu'awiya be a just ruler and that he would not establish a dynasty. After the death of Hasan in 670, his younger brother Husayn became the head of the Banu Hashim clan to which the Islamic prophet Muhammad also belonged. Though his father's supporters in Kufa gave him their allegiance, he would abide to the peace treaty between Hasan and Mu'awiya as long as the latter was alive.

The Battle of Karbala occurred within the crisis resulting from the succession of Yazid I. In 676, Mu'awiya nominated his son Yazid as successor, a move labelled by the historian Wilferd Madelung as breach of the Hasan–Muawiya treaty. With no precedence in Islamic history, hereditary succession aroused opposition from several quarters. Mu'awiya summoned a shura, or consultative assembly, in Damascus and persuaded representatives from many provinces to agree to his plan by diplomacy and bribes. He then ordered Marwan ibn al-Hakam, then the governor of Medina, where Husayn and several other influential Muslims resided, to announce the decision. Marwan faced resistance to this announcement, especially from Husayn, Abd Allah ibn al-Zubayr, Abd Allah ibn Umar and Abd al-Rahman ibn Abi Bakr, the sons of Muhammad's prominent companions, all of whom, by virtue of their descent, could also lay claim to the caliphal title. Mu'awiya went to Medina and pressed the four dissenters to accede. He followed and threatened some of them with death, but they still refused to support him. Nonetheless, Mu'awiya convinced the people of Mecca that the four had pledged their allegiance, and received allegiance from them for Yazid. On his return to Damascus, he secured allegiance from the people of Medina as well. There was no further overt protest against the plan for Yazid's succession. According to the historians Fitzpatrick and Walker, Yazid's succession, which was considered as an "anomaly in Islamic history", transformed the government from a "consultative" form to a monarchy. Before his death in April 680, Mu'awiya cautioned Yazid that Husayn and Ibn al-Zubayr might challenge his rule and instructed him to defeat them if they did. Yazid was further advised to treat Husayn with caution and not to spill his blood, since he was the grandson of Muhammad.

Prelude

On his succession, Yazid charged the governor of Medina, Walid ibn Utba ibn Abu Sufyan, to secure allegiance from Husayn, Ibn al-Zubayr and Abd Allah ibn Umar, with force if necessary. Walid sought the advice of his Umayyad relative Marwan ibn al-Hakam, who suggested that Ibn al-Zubayr and Husayn should be forced to pledge allegiance as they were dangerous, while Ibn Umar should be left alone since he posed no threat. Walid summoned the two, but Ibn al-Zubayr escaped to Mecca. Husayn answered the summons but declined to pledge allegiance in the secretive environment of the meeting, suggesting it should be done in public. Marwan told Walid to imprison or behead him, but due to Husayn's kinship with Muhammad, Walid was unwilling to take any action against him. A few days later, Husayn left for Mecca without acknowledging Yazid. He arrived in Mecca at the beginning of May 680, and stayed there until the beginning of September.

Husayn had considerable support in Kufa, which had been the caliphal capital during the reigns of his father and brother. The Kufans had fought the Umayyads and their Syrian allies during the First Fitna, the five-year civil war which had established the Umayyad Caliphate. They were dissatisfied with Hasan's abdication and strongly resented Umayyad rule. While in Mecca, Husayn received letters from pro-Alids in Kufa informing him that they were tired of the Umayyad rule, which they considered to be oppressive, and that they had no rightful leader. They asked him to lead them in revolt against Yazid, promising to remove the Umayyad governor if Husayn would consent to aid them. Husayn wrote back affirmatively that a rightful leader is the one who acts according to the Qur'an and promised to lead them with the right guidance. Then he sent his cousin Muslim ibn Aqil to assess the situation in Kufa. Ibn Aqil attracted widespread support and informed Husayn of the situation, suggesting that he join them there. Yazid removed Nu'man ibn Bashir al-Ansari as governor of Kufa due to his inaction, and installed Ubayd Allah ibn Ziyad, then governor of Basra, in his place. As a result of Ibn Ziyad's suppression and political maneuvering, Ibn Aqil's following began to dissipate and he was forced to declare the revolt prematurely. It was defeated and Ibn Aqil was killed. Husayn had also sent a messenger to Basra, another garrison town in Iraq, but the messenger could not attract any following and was quickly apprehended and executed.

Husayn was unaware of the change of political circumstances in Kufa and decided to depart. Abd Allah ibn Abbas and Abd Allah ibn al-Zubayr advised him not to move to Iraq, or if he was determined, not to take women and children with him. The sincerity of Ibn al-Zubayr's advice has been doubted by many historians, however, as he had his own plans for leadership and was supposedly happy to be rid of Husayn. Nevertheless, he offered Husayn support if he would stay in Mecca and lead the opposition to Yazid from there. Husayn refused this, citing his abhorrence of bloodshed in the sanctuary, and decided to go ahead with his plan.

Journey towards Kufa
Husayn left Mecca with some fifty men and his family on 9 September 680 (8 Dhu al-Hijjah 60 AH), a day before Hajj. He took the northerly route through the Arabian Desert. On persuasion of Husayn's cousin Abd Allah ibn Ja'far, the governor of Mecca Amr ibn Sa'id sent his brother and Ibn Ja'far after Husayn in order to assure him safety in Mecca and bring him back. Husayn refused to return, relating that Muhammad had ordered him in a dream to move forward irrespective of the consequences. At a place known as Tan'im, he seized a caravan carrying dyeing plants and clothes sent by the governor of Yemen to Yazid. Further on the way, at a place called Tha'labiyya, the small caravan received the news of the execution of Ibn Aqil and the indifference of the people of Kufa. Husayn at this point is reported to have considered turning back, but was persuaded to push forward by Ibn Aqil's brothers, who wanted to avenge his death; according to Madelung and I. K. A. Howard, these reports are doubtful. Later, at Zubala, Husayn learned of the capture and execution of his messenger Qays ibn Musahir al-Saydawi, whom he had sent from the Hejaz (western Arabia) to Kufa to announce his arrival. He informed his followers of the situation and asked them to leave. Most of the people who had joined him on the way left, while his companions from Mecca decided to stay with him.

Ibn Ziyad had stationed troops on the routes into Kufa. Husayn and his followers were intercepted by the vanguard of Yazid's army, about 1,000 men led by Hurr ibn Yazid al-Tamimi, south of Kufa near Qadisiyya. Husayn said to them: I did not come to you until your letters were brought to me, and your messengers came to me saying, 'Come to us, for we have no imām. God may unite us in the truth through you.' Since this was your view, I have come to you. Therefore, if you give me what you guaranteed in your covenants and sworn testimonies, I will come to your town. If you will not and are averse to my coming, I will leave you for the place from which I came to you. He then showed them the letters he had received from the Kufans, including some in Hurr's force. Hurr denied any knowledge of the letters and stated that Husayn must go with him to Ibn Ziyad, which Husayn refused to do. Hurr responded that he would not allow Husayn to either enter Kufa or go back to Medina, but that he was free to travel anywhere else he wished. Nevertheless, he did not prevent four Kufans from joining Husayn. Husayn's caravan started to move towards Qadisiyya, and Hurr followed them. At Naynawa, Hurr received orders from Ibn Ziyad to force Husayn's caravan to halt in a desolate place without fortifications or water. One of Husayn's companions suggested that they attack Hurr and move to the fortified village of al-Aqr. Husayn refused, stating that he did not want to start the hostilities.

On the following day, a 4,000-strong Kufan army arrived under the command of Umar ibn Sa'd. He had been appointed governor of Rayy to suppress a local rebellion, but then recalled to confront Husayn. Initially, he was unwilling to fight Husayn, but complied following Ibn Ziyad's threat to revoke his governorship. After negotiations with Husayn, Ibn Sa'd wrote to Ibn Ziyad that Husayn was willing to return. Ibn Ziyad replied that Husayn must surrender or he should be subdued by force, and that to compel him, he and his companions should be denied access to the Euphrates river. Ibn Sa'd stationed 500 horsemen on the route leading to the river. Husayn and his companions remained without water for three days before a group of fifty men led by his half-brother Abbas was able to access the river. They could only fill twenty water-skins.

Husayn and Ibn Sa'd met during the night to negotiate a settlement; it was rumored that Husayn made three proposals: either he be allowed to return to Medina, submit to Yazid directly, or be sent to a border post where he would fight alongside the Muslim armies. According to Madelung, these reports are probably untrue as Husayn at this stage is unlikely to have considered submitting to Yazid. A mawla of Husayn's wife later claimed that Husayn had suggested that he be allowed to leave, so that all parties could allow the fluid political situation to clarify. Ibn Sa'd sent the proposal, whatever it was, to Ibn Ziyad, who is reported to have accepted but then persuaded otherwise by Shemr ibn Ziljawshan. Shemr argued that Husayn was in his domain and letting him go would be to demonstrate weakness. Ibn Ziyad then sent Shemr with orders to ask Husayn for his allegiance once more and to attack, kill and disfigure him if he was to refuse, as "a rebel, a seditious person, a brigand, an oppressor and he was to do no further harm after his death". If Ibn Sa'd was unwilling to carry out the attack, he was instructed to hand over command to Shemr. Ibn Sa'd cursed Shemr and accused him of foiling his attempts to reach a peaceful settlement but agreed to carry out the orders. He remarked that Husayn would not submit because there was "a proud soul in him".

The army advanced toward Husayn's camp on the evening of 9 October. Husayn sent Abbas to ask Ibn Sa'd to wait until the next morning, so that they could consider the matter. Ibn Sa'd agreed to this respite. Husayn told his men that they were all free to leave, with his family, under the cover of night, since their opponents only wanted him. Very few availed themselves of this opportunity. Defense arrangements were made: tents were brought together and tied to one another and a ditch was dug behind the tents and filled with wood ready to be set alight in case of attack. Husayn and his followers then spent the rest of the night praying.

Battle
After the morning prayer on 10 October, both parties took up battle positions. Husayn appointed Zuhayr ibn Qayn to command the right flank of his army, Habib ibn Muzahir to command the left flank, and his half-brother Abbas as the standard bearer. Husayn's companions, according to most accounts, numbered thirty-two horsemen and forty infantrymen; although forty-five horsemen and one hundred foot-soldiers, or a total of a few hundred men have been reported by some sources. Ibn Sa'd's army totaled 4,000. According to the Shi'a sources, however, more troops had joined Ibn Sa'd in preceding days, swelling his army to 30,000 strong. The ditch containing wood were set alight. Husayn then delivered a speech to his opponents reminding them of his status as Muhammad's grandson and reproaching them for inviting and then abandoning him. He asked to be allowed to leave. He was told that first he had to submit to Yazid's authority, which he refused to do. Husayn's speech moved Al-Hurr ibn Yazid Al-Tamimi to defect to his side.

After Husayn's speech, Zuhayr ibn Qayn attempted to dissuade Ibn Sa'd's soldiers from killing Husayn, but in vain. Ibn Sa'd's army fired several volleys of arrows. This was followed by duels in which several of Husayn's companions were slain. The right wing of the Kufans, led by Amr ibn al-Hajjaj, attacked Husayn's force, but was repulsed. Hand-to-hand fighting paused and further volleys of arrows were exchanged. Shemr, who commanded the left wing of the Umayyad army, launched an attack, but after losses on both sides he was repulsed. This was followed by cavalry attacks. Husayn's cavalry resisted fiercely and Ibn Sa'd brought in armoured cavalry and five hundred archers. After their horses were wounded by arrows, Husayn's cavalrymen dismounted and fought on foot.

Since Umayyad forces could approach Husayn's army from the front only, Ibn Sa'd ordered the tents to be burned. All except the one which Husayn and his family were using were set on fire. Shemr wanted to burn that one too, but was prevented by his companions. The plan backfired and flames hindered the Umayyad advance for a while. After noon prayers, Husayn's companions were encircled, and almost all of them were killed. Husayn's relatives, who had not taken part in the fighting so far, joined the battle. Husayn's son Ali Akbar was killed; then Husayn's half-brothers, including Abbas, and the sons of Aqil ibn Abi Talib, Jafar ibn Abi Talib and Hasan ibn Ali were slain. The account of Abbas' death is not given in the primary sources, al-Tabari and Baladhuri, but a prominent Shi'a theologian Shaykh Al-Mufid states in his account in Kitab al-Irshad that Abbas went to the river together with Husayn but became separated, was surrounded, and killed. At some point, a young child of Husayn's, who was sitting on his lap, was hit by an arrow and died.

Death of Husayn ibn Ali 

The Umayyad soldiers hesitated to attack Husayn directly, but he was struck in the mouth by an arrow as he went to the river to drink. He collected his blood in a cupped hand and cast towards the sky, complaining to God of his suffering. Later, he was surrounded and struck on the head by Malik ibn Nusayr. The blow cut through his hooded cloak, which Husayn removed while cursing his attacker. He put a cap on his head and wrapped a turban around it to staunch the bleeding. Ibn Nusayr seized the bloodied cloak and retreated.

Shemr advanced with a group of foot soldiers towards Husayn, who was now prepared to fight as few people were left on his side. A young boy from Husayn's camp escaped from the tents, ran to him, tried to defend him from a sword stroke and had his arm cut off. Ibn Sa'd approached the tents, and Husayn's sister Zaynab complained to him: "'Umar b. Sa'd, will Abu 'Abd Allah (the kunya of Husayn) be killed while you stand and watch?" Ibn Sa'd wept but did nothing. Husayn is said to have killed many of his attackers. They were, however, still unwilling to kill him and each of them wanted to leave this to somebody else. Eventually Shemr shouted: "Shame on you! Why are you waiting for the man? Kill him, may your mothers be deprived of you!" The Umayyad soldiers then rushed Husayn and wounded him on his hand and shoulder. He fell on the ground face-down and an attacker named Sinan ibn Anas stabbed and then decapitated him.

Aftermath
Seventy or seventy-two people died on Husayn's side, of whom about twenty were descendants of Abu Talib, the father of Ali. This included two of Husayn's sons, six of his paternal brothers, three sons of Hasan ibn Ali, three sons of Jafar ibn Abi Talib, and three sons and three grandsons of Aqil ibn Abi Talib. Following the battle, Husayn's clothes were stripped, and his sword, shoes and baggage were taken. The women's jewelry and cloaks were also seized. Shemr wanted to kill Husayn's only surviving son Ali Zayn al-Abidin, who had not taken part in the fighting because of illness, but was prevented by Ibn Sa'd. There are reports of more than sixty wounds on Husayn's body, which was then trampled with horses as previously instructed by Ibn Ziyad. The bodies of Husayn's companions were decapitated. There were eighty-eight dead in Ibn Sa'd's army, who were buried before he left. After his departure, members of the Banu Asad tribe, from the nearby village of Ghadiriya, buried the headless bodies of Husayn's companions.

Husayn's family, along with the heads of the dead, were sent to Ibn Ziyad. He poked Husayn's mouth with a stick and intended to kill Ali Zayn al-Abidin, but spared him after the pleas of Husayn's sister Zaynab. The heads and the family were then sent to Yazid, who also poked Husayn's mouth with a stick. The historian Henri Lammens has suggested that this is a duplication of the report regarding Ibn Ziyad. Yazid was compassionate towards the women and Ali Zayn al-Abidin, and cursed Ibn Ziyad for murdering Husayn, stating that had he been there, he would have spared him. One of his courtiers asked for the hand of a captive woman from Husayn's family in marriage, which resulted in heated altercation between Yazid and Zaynab. The women of Yazid's household joined the captive women in their lamentation for the dead. After a few days, the women were compensated for their belongings looted in Karbala and were sent back to Medina.

Later uprisings

Ibn al-Zubayr's revolt

Following Husayn's death, Yazid faced increased opposition to his rule from Abd Allah ibn al-Zubayr. Ibn al-Zubayr started secretly recruiting supporters in Mecca, while overtly calling for a shura to elect a new caliph. Ibn al-Zuabyr's influence reached Medina, where citizens were already disillusioned with Umayyad rule and Mu'awiya's  agricultural projects, which included confiscating lands from them to increase the government's revenue. Yazid invited the notables of Medina to Damascus and tried to win them over with gifts. They were unpersuaded and on their return to Medina narrated tales of Yazid's lavish lifestyle and impious practices. The Medinese, under the leadership of Abd Allah ibn Hanzala, the son of a leading companion of Muhammad, renounced their allegiance to Yazid and expelled the governor and the Umayyads residing in the city. Yazid sent a 12,000-strong army under the veteran commander Muslim ibn Uqba to reconquer the Hejaz. After failed negotiations, the Medinese were defeated at the Battle of al-Harrah, and the city was plundered for three days. Having forced the rebels to renew their allegiance, the Syrian army besieged Mecca. After Yazid's death in November 683, the army withdrew to Syria and Ibn al-Zubayr declared himself caliph, receiving widespread recognition throughout the caliphate. Nevertheless, Mukhtar al-Thaqafi, his erstwhile ally, took over Kufa and most of Iraq from Ibn al-Zubayr's governor, and Kharijites in Basra, Persia and Arabia weakened his authority. Although the Zubayrids defeated Mukhtar, the  forces of Abd al-Malik ibn Marwan, who became the Umayyad caliph in Syria in 685, defeated and killed Ibn al-Zubayr in 692. The latter's defeat marked the reestablishment Umayyad rule over the caliphate.

Tawwabin uprising

A few prominent Alid supporters in Kufa felt guilty for abandoning Husayn after having invited him to revolt. To atone for what they perceived as their sin, they began a movement known as the Tawwabin, under Sulayman ibn Surad, a companion of Muhammad, to fight the Umayyads. As long as Iraq was in Umayyad hands, the movement remained underground. After the death of Yazid in November 683, the people of Iraq drove out the Umayyad governor Ibn Ziyad; the Tawwabin called on the people to avenge Husayn's death, attracting large-scale support. Lacking any political program, they intended to punish the Umayyads or sacrifice themselves in the struggle. Their slogan was "Revenge for Husayn". Mukhtar al-Thaqafi, another prominent pro-Alid of Kufa, attempted to dissuade the Tawwabin from this endeavor in favor of an organized movement to take control of the city, but Ibn Surad's stature as a companion of Muhammad and an old ally of Ali, prevented most of his followers from accepting Mukhtar's proposal. Although 16,000 men enlisted to fight, only 4,000 mustered. In November 684, the Tawwabin left to confront the Umayyads, after mourning for a day at Husayn's grave in Karbala. The armies met in January 685 at the three-day Battle of Ayn al-Warda in present-day northern Syria; most of the Tawwabin, including Ibn Surad, were killed. A few escaped to Kufa and joined Mukhtar.

Revolt of Mukhtar al-Thaqafi

Mukhtar was an early settler of Kufa, having arrived in Iraq following its initial conquest by the Muslims. He had participated in the failed rebellion of Muslim ibn Aqil, for which he was imprisoned by Ibn Ziyad, before being released after the intervention of Abd Allah ibn Umar. Mukhtar then went to Mecca and had a short-lived alliance with Ibn al-Zubayr. After Yazid's death, he returned to Kufa where he advocated revenge against Husayn's killers and the establishment of an Alid caliphate in the name of Husayn's half-brother Muhammad ibn al-Hanafiyya, and declared himself his representative. The defeat of the Tawwabin left the leadership of the Kufan pro-Alids in his hands. In October 685, Mukhtar and his supporters, a significant of number of whom consisted of local converts (mawali), overthrew Ibn al-Zubayr's governor and seized Kufa. His control extended to most of Iraq and parts of northwestern Iran. His attitude towards mawali, whom he awarded many favors and equal status with Arabs, provoked a rebellion by the dissatisfied Arab aristocracy. After crushing the rebellion, Mukhtar executed Kufans involved in the killing of Husayn, including Ibn Sa'd and Shemr, while thousands of people fled to Basra. He then sent his general Ibrahim ibn al-Ashtar to fight an approaching Umayyad army, led by Ibn Ziyad, which had been sent to reconquer the province. The Umayyad army was routed at the Battle of Khazir in August 686 and Ibn Ziyad was slain. Meanwhile, Mukhtar's relations with Ibn al-Zubayr worsened and Kufan refugees in Basra persuaded Mus'ab ibn al-Zubayr, the governor of the city and younger brother of Abd Allah ibn al-Zubayr, to attack Kufa. Facing defeat in open battle, Mukhtar and his remaining supporters took refuge in the palace of Kufa and were besieged by Mus'ab. Four months later, in April 687, Mukhtar was killed while some 6,000–8,000 of his supporters were executed. According to Mohsen Zakeri, Mukhtar's attitude towards mawali was one of the reasons behind his failure, as Kufa was not ready for such "revolutionary measures". Mukhtar's supporters survived the collapse of his revolution and evolved into a sect known as the Kaysanites. The Hashimiyya, a splinter group of the Kaysanites, was later taken over by the Abbasids and eventually overthrew the Umayyads in 750.

Primary and classic sources

The primary source of the Karbala narrative is the work of the Kufan historian Abu Mikhnaf titled Kitab Maqtal Al-Husayn. Other early monographs on the death of Husayn, which have not survived, were written by al-Asbagh al-Nubata, Jabir ibn Yazid al-Ju'fi, Ammar ibn Mu'awiya al-Duhni, Awana ibn al-Hakam, al-Waqidi, Hisham ibn al-Kalbi, Nasr ibn Muzahim, and al-Mada'ini; of these al-Nubta's monograph was perhaps the earliest. Although Abu Mikhnaf's date of birth is unknown, he was an adult by the time of the revolt of Ibn al-Ash'ath, which occurred in 701, some twenty years after the Battle of Karbala. As such he knew many eyewitnesses and collected firsthand accounts and some with very short chains of transmission, usually only one or two intermediaries. The eyewitnesses were of two kinds: those from Husayn's side; and those from Ibn Sa'd's army. Since few people from Husayn's camp survived, most eyewitnesses were from the second category. According to Julius Wellhausen, most of them regretted their actions in the battle and embellished the accounts of the battle in favor of Husayn in order to dilute their guilt. Although as an Iraqi, Abu Mikhnaf had pro-Alid tendencies, his reports generally do not contain much bias on his part. Abu Mikhnaf's original text seems to have been lost and the version extant today has been transmitted through secondary sources such as the History of Prophets and Kings, also known as The History of Tabari, by Muḥammad ibn Jarir al-Tabari; and Ansab al-Ashraf by Ahmad ibn Yaḥya al-Baladhuri. Nevertheless, four manuscripts of a Maqtal located at Gotha (No. 1836), Berlin (Sprenger, Nos. 159–160), Leiden (No. 792), and Saint Petersburg (Am No. 78) libraries have been attributed to Abu Mikhnaf. Tabari quotes either directly from Abu Mikhnaf or from his student Ibn al-Kalbi, who took most of his material from Abu Mikhnaf. Tabari occasionally takes material from Ammar ibn Mu'awiya, Awana and other primary sources, which, however, adds little to the narrative. Baladhuri uses same sources as Tabari. Information on the battle found in the works of Dinawari and Ya'qubi is also based on Abu Mikhnaf's Maqtal, although they occasionally provide some extra notes and verses. Other secondary sources include al-Mas'udi's Muruj al-Dhahab, Ibn Ath'am's Kitab al-Futuh, Shaykh al-Mufid's Kitab al-Irshad, and Abu al-Faraj al-Isfahani's Maqatil al-Talibiyyin. Most of these sources took material from Abu Mikhnaf, in addition to some from the primary works of Awana, al-Mada'ini and Nasr ibn Muzahim.

Although Tabari and other early sources contain some miraculous stories, these sources are mainly historical and rational in nature, in contrast to the literature of later periods, which is mainly hagiographical in nature.

The Battle of Karbala was also reported by an early Christian source. A history by the Syriac Christian scholar Theophilus of Edessa, who was chief astrologer in the  Abbasid court between 775 and 785, is partially preserved in a number of extant Christian chronicles, including those by Michael the Syrian and the Byzantine historian Theophanes the Confessor. Theophilus's history corroborates the death in battle of Husayn and most of his men at Karbala after suffering from thirst. But in contrast to all Muslim sources, which state that Husayn fought Yazid, Theophilus appears to have written that Husayn was killed by Muawiyah as the final engagement of the First Fitna between the Umayyads and Ali's supporters.

Historical analysis
Based on an official report sent to caliph Yazid, which describes the battle very briefly, stating that it lasted for no longer than a siesta, Lammens concludes that there was no battle at all but a quick massacre that was over in an hour; he suggests that the detailed accounts found in the primary sources are Iraqi fabrications, since their writers were dissatisfied with their hero being killed without putting up a fight. This is countered by the historian Laura Veccia Vaglieri, who argues that despite there being some fabricated accounts, all of the contemporary accounts together form "a coherent and credible narrative". She criticizes Lammens' hypothesis as being based on a single isolated report and being devoid of critical analysis. Similarly, Madelung and Wellhausen assert that the battle lasted from sunrise to sunset and that the overall account of the battle is reliable. Vaglieri and Madelung explain the length of the battle despite the numerical disparity between the opposing camps as Ibn Sa'd's attempt to prolong the fight and pressure Husayn into submission instead of attempting to quickly overwhelm and kill him.

According to Wellhausen, the compassion that Yazid showed to the family of Husayn, and his cursing of Ibn Ziyad was only for show. He argues that if killing Husayn was a crime its responsibility lay with Yazid and not Ibn Ziyad, who was only performing his duty. Madelung holds a similar view; according to him, early accounts place the responsibility for Husayn's death on Ibn Ziyad instead of Yazid. Yazid, Madelung argues, wanted to end Husayn's opposition, but as a caliph of Islam could not afford to be seen as publicly responsible and so diverted blame onto Ibn Ziyad by hypocritically cursing him. According to Howard, some traditional sources have a tendency to exonerate Yazid at the cost of Ibn Ziyad and lower authorities.

Modern historical views on motivations of Husayn
Wellhausen has described Husayn's revolt as a premature and ill-prepared campaign by an ambitious person. He writes "He reaches out to the moon like a child. He makes the greatest demands and does not do the slightest; the others should do everything... As soon as he encounters resistance, it is over with him; he wants to go back when it is too late." Lammens has agreed to this view and he sees in Husayn a person who disturbs public peace. According to Heinz Halm, this was a struggle for political leadership between the second generation of Muslims, in which the poorly equipped pretender ended up losing. Fred Donner, G. R. Hawting, and Hugh N. Kennedy see Husayn's revolt as an attempt to regain what his brother Hasan had renounced.

Vaglieri, on the other hand, considers him to be motivated by ideology, saying that if the materials that have come down to us are authentic, they convey an image of person who is "convinced that he was in the right, stubbornly determined to achieve his ends..." Holding a similar view, Madelung has argued that Husayn was not a "reckless rebel" but a religious man motivated by pious convictions. According to him, Husayn was convinced that "the family of the Prophet was divinely chosen to lead the community founded by Moḥammad, as the latter had been chosen, and had both an inalienable right and an obligation to seek this leadership." He was, however, not seeking martyrdom and wanted to return when his expected support did not materialize. Maria Dakake holds that Husayn considered the Umayyad rule oppressive and misguided, and revolted to reorient the Islamic community in the right direction. A similar view is held by Mahmoud Ayoub. S. M. Jafri proposes that Husayn, although motivated by ideology, did not intend to secure leadership for himself. Husayn, Jafri asserts, was from the start aiming for martyrdom in order to jolt the collective conscience of the Muslim community and reveal what he considers to be the oppressive and anti-Islamic nature of the Umayyad regime.

Impact

The killing of the grandson of Muhammad shocked the Muslim community. The image of Yazid suffered and gave rise to sentiment that he was impious. The event has had an emotional impact on Sunnis, who remember the event as a tragic incident and those killed in the company of Husayn as martyrs. The impact on Shi'a Islam has been much deeper.

Shi'a Islam
Prior to the Battle of Karbala, the Muslim community was divided into two political factions. Nonetheless, a religious sect with distinct theological doctrines and specific set of rituals had not developed. Karbala gave this early political party of pro-Alids a distinct religious identity and helped transform it into a distinct religious sect. Heinz Halm writes: "There was no religious aspect to Shi'ism prior to 680. The death of the third imam and his followers marked the 'big bang' that created the rapidly expanding cosmos of Shi'ism and brought it into motion."

Husayn's death at Karbala is believed by Shi'as to be a sacrifice made to prevent the corruption of Islam by tyrannical rulers and to protect its ideology. He is, as such, believed to have been fully aware of his fate and the outcome of his revolt, which was divinely ordained. He is thus remembered as the prince of martyrs (Sayyed al-Shuhada). The historian G. R. Hawting describes the Battle of Karbala as a "supreme" example of "suffering and martyrdom" for Shi'as. According to Abdulaziz Sachedina, it is seen by Shi'as the climax of suffering and oppression, revenge for which came to be one of the primary goals of many Shi'a uprisings. This revenge is believed to be one of the fundamental objectives of the future revolution of the twelfth Shi'a Imam Muhammad al-Mahdi, whose return is awaited. With his return, Husayn and his seventy-two companions are expected to be resurrected along with their killers, who will then be punished.

Shi'a observances

Shi'a Muslims consider pilgrimages to Husayn's tomb to be a source of divine blessings and rewards. According to Shi'a tradition the first such visit was performed by Husayn's son Ali Zayn al-Abidin and the surviving family members during their return from Syria to Medina. The first historically recorded visit is Sulayman ibn Surad and the Penitents going to Husayn's grave before their departure to Syria. They are reported to have lamented and beaten their chests and to have spent a night by the tomb. Thereafter this tradition was limited to the Shi'a imams for several decades, before gaining momentum under the sixth Shi'a imam Jafar Sadiq and his followers. Buyids and Safavids also encouraged this practice. Special visits are paid on 10 Muharram (Ashura Pilgrimage) and 40 days after the anniversary of Husayn's (Arba'een Pilgrimage). The soil of Karbala is considered to have miraculous healing effects.

Mourning for Husayn is considered by Shi'as to be a source of salvation in the afterlife, and is undertaken as a remembrance of his suffering. After the death of Husayn, when his family was being taken to Ibn Ziyad, Husayn's sister Zaynab is reported to have cried out after seeing his headless body: "O Muhammad!... Here is Husayn in the open, stained with blood and with limbs torn off. O Muhammad! Your daughters are prisoners, your progeny are killed, and the east wind blows dust over them." Shi'a Muslims consider this to be the first instance of wailing and mourning over the death of Husayn. Husayn's son Zayn al-Abideen is reported to have spent the rest of his life weeping for his father. Similarly, Husayn's mother Fatima is believed to be weeping for him in paradise and the weeping of believers is considered to be a way of sharing her sorrows. Special gatherings (majalis; sing. majlis) are arranged in places reserved for this purpose, called husayniyya. In these gatherings the story of Karbala is narrated and various elegies (rawda) are recited by professional reciters (rawda khwan).

During the month of Muharram, elaborate public processions are performed in commemoration of the Battle of Karbala. In contrast to pilgrimage to Husayn's tomb and simple lamenting, these processions do not date back to the time of the battle, but arose during tenth century. Their earliest recorded instance was in Baghdad in 963 during the reign of the first Buyid ruler Mu'izz al-Dawla. The processions start from a husayniyya and the participants parade barefoot through the streets, wailing and beating their chests and heads before returning to the husayniyya for a majlis. Sometimes, chains and knives are used to inflict wounds and physical pain. In South Asia, an ornately tacked horse called zuljenah, representing Husayn's battle horse, is also led riderless through the streets. In Iran, the battle scenes of Karbala are performed on stage in front of an audience in a ritual called taziya (passion play), also known as shabih. In India however, taziya refers to the coffins and replicas of Husayn's tomb carried in processions.

Most of these rituals take place during the first ten days of Muharram, reaching a climax on the tenth day, although majalis can also occur throughout the year. Occasionally, especially in the past, some Sunni participation in majalis and processions has been observed. According to Yitzhak Nakash, the rituals of Muharram have an "important" effect in the "invoking the memory of Karbala", as these help consolidate the collective identity and memory of the Shi'a community. Anthropologist Michael Fischer states that commemoration of the Battle of Karbala by the Shi'a is not only the retelling of the story, but also presents them with "life models and norms of behavior" which are applicable to all aspects of life, which he calls the Karbala Paradigm. According to Olmo Gölz, the Karbala Paradigm provide Shi'as with heroic norms and a martyr ethos, and represents an embodiment of the battle between good and evil, justice and injustice. Rituals involving self-flagellation have been criticized by many Shi'a scholars as they are considered to be innovative practices damaging reputation of Shi'ism. Iranian supreme leader Ayatollah Ali Khamenei has banned the practice in Iran since 1994.

Politics

The first political use of the death of Husayn seems to have been during the revolt of Mukhtar, when he seized Kufa under the slogan of "Revenge for Husayn". Although the Penitents had used the same slogan, they do not seem have had a political program. In order to enhance their legitimacy, Abbasid rulers claimed to have avenged the death of Husayn by dethroning the Umayyads. During the early years of their rule, they also encouraged Muharram rituals. Buyids, a Shi'a dynasty originally from Iran which later occupied the Abbasid capital Baghdad while accepting the Abbasid caliph's suzerainty, promoted the public rituals of Muharram to portray themselves as patrons of religion and to strengthen the Shi'a identity in Iraq. After taking over Iran in 1501, Safavids, who were previously a Sufi order, declared the state religion to be Twelver Shi'ism. In this regard, Karbala and Muharram rituals came to be a vehicle of Safavid propaganda and a means of consolidating the dynasty's Shi'a identity. Riza Yildirim has claimed that the impetus of the Safvid revolution was the revenge of the death of Husayn. The founder of the dynasty, Shah Ismail, considered himself to be the Mahdi (the twelfth Shi'a Imam) or his forerunner. Similarly, Qajars also patronized Muharram rituals such as processions, taziya and majalis, to improve the relationship between the state and the public.

Iranian revolution
Karbala and Shi'a symbolism played a significant role in the Iranian Revolution of 1979. In contrast to the traditional view of Shi'ism as a religion of suffering, mourning and political quietism, Shi'a Islam and Karbala were given a new interpretation in the period preceding the revolution by rationalist intellectuals and religious revisionists like Jalal Al-e-Ahmad, Ali Shariati and Nematollah Salehi Najafabadi. According to these, Shi'ism was an ideology of revolution and political struggle against tyranny and exploitation, and the Battle of Karbala and the death of Husayn was to be seen as a model for revolutionary struggle; weeping and mourning was to be replaced by political activism to realize the ideals of Husayn.

After the White Revolution reforms of the Iranian Shah Mohammad Reza Pahlavi, which were opposed by the Iranian clergy and others, Ruhollah Khomeini labelled the Shah as the Yazid of his time. Condemning the Iranian monarchy, Khomeini wrote: "The struggle of al-Husayn at Karbalâ is interpreted in the same way as a struggle against the non-Islamic principle of monarchy." Opposition to the Shah was thus compared with the opposition of Husayn to Yazid, and Muharram ritual gatherings became increasingly political in nature. According to Aghaie, the Shah's hostility towards various Muharram rituals, which he considered to be uncivilized, contributed to his fall. The Islamic republic that was established after the revolution has since promoted Muharram rituals. The clerics encourage public participation in elections as a form of "political activism" comparable to that of Husayn. Martyrdom spirit influenced by the death of Husayn was frequently witnessed in Iranian troops during the Iran–Iraq war.

Literature

Mir Mosharraf Hossain's 19th century novel on Karbala, Bishad Sindhu (the Ocean of Sorrow), established the precedent of the Islamic epic in Bangali literature. South Asian philosopher and poet Muhammad Iqbal sees Husayn's sacrifice as being similar to that of Ishmael and compares Yazid's opposition to Husayn with the opposition of Pharaoh to Moses. Urdu poet Ghalib compares Husayn's suffering with that of Mansur al-Hallaj, a tenth century Sufi, who was executed on a charge of claiming divinity.

Maqtal literature and legendary accounts
Maqtal (pl. Maqatil) works narrate the story of someone's death. Although Maqatil on the deaths of Ali, Uthman and various others have been written, the Maqtal genre has focused mainly on the story of Husayn's death.

As well as Abu Mikhnaf's Maqtal, other Arabic Maqatil on Husayn were written. Most of these mix history with legend and have elaborate details on Husayn's miraculous birth, which is stated to be on 10 Muharram, coinciding with his date of death. The universe as well as humanity are described as having been created on the day of Ashura (10 Muharram). Ashura is also asserted to have been the day of both Abraham's and Muhammad's birth and of the ascension of Jesus to heaven, and of numerous other events concerning prophets. Husayn is claimed to have performed various miracles, including quenching his companions' thirst by putting his thumb in their mouths and satisfying their hunger by bringing down food from the heavens, and to have killed several thousand Umayyad attackers. Other accounts claim that when Husayn died, his horse shed tears and killed many Umayyad soldiers; the sky became red and it rained blood; angels, jinns and wild animals wept; that light emanated from Husayn's severed head and that it recited the Qur'an; and that all of his killers met calamitous end.

Maqtal later entered Persian, Turkish, and Urdu literature, and inspired the development of rawda.

Marthiya and rawda
When Shi'ism became the official religion of Iran in the 16th century, Safavid rulers such as Shah Tahmasp I, patronized poets who wrote about the Battle of Karbala. The genre of marthiya (poems in the memory of the dead, with popular forms of Karbala related marthiya being rawda and nawha), according to Persian scholar Wheeler Thackston, "was particularly cultivated by the Safavids." Various Persian authors wrote texts retelling romanticized and synthesized versions of the battle and events from it, including Sa'id al-Din's Rawdat al-Islam (The Garden of Islam) and Al-Khawarazmi's Maqtal nur 'al-'a'emmah (The Site of the Murder of the Light of the Imams). These influenced the composition of the more popular text Rawdat al-Shuhada (Garden of Martyrs), which was written in 1502 by Husain Wa'iz Kashefi. Kashefi's composition was an effective factor in the development of rawda khwani, a ritual recounting of the battle events in majalis.

Inspired by Rawdat al-Shuhada, the Azerbaijani poet Fuzûlî wrote an abridged and simplified version of it in Ottoman Turkish in his work Hadiqat al-Su'ada. It influenced similar works in Albanian on the subject. Dalip Frashëri's Kopshti i te Mirevet is the earliest, and longest epic so far, written in the Albanian language; the Battle of Karbala is described in detail and Frashëri eulogizes those who fell as martyrs, in particular Husayn.

Urdu marthiya is predominantly religious in nature and usually concentrates on lamenting the Battle of Karbala. South Indian rulers of Bijapur (Ali Adil Shah), and Golkonda Sultanate (Muhammad Quli Qutb Shah) were patrons of poetry and encouraged Urdu marthiya recitation in Muharram. Urdu marthiya afterwards became popular throughout India. Famous Urdu poets Mir Taqi Mir, Mirza Rafi Sauda, Mir Anees, and Mirza Salaamat Ali Dabeer have also composed marthiya. Comparing Karl Marx with Husayn, Josh Malihabadi argues that Karbala is not a story of the past to be recounted by the religious clerics in majalis, but should be seen as a model for revolutionary struggle towards the goal of a classless society and economic justice.

Sufi poetry
In Sufism, where annihilation of the self (nafs) and suffering in the path of God are paramount principles, Husayn is seen as a model Sufi. Persian Sufi poet Hakim Sanai describes Husayn as a martyr, higher in rank than all the other martyrs of the world; while Farid ud-Din Attar considers him a prototype of a Sufi who sacrificed himself in the love of God. Jalal ud-Din Rumi describes Husayn's suffering at Karbala as a means to achieve union with the divine, and hence considers it to be a matter of jubilation rather than grief. Sindhi Sufi poet Shah Abdul Latif Bhittai devoted a section in his Shah Jo Risalo to the death of Husayn, in which the incident is remembered in laments and elegies. He too sees Husayn's death as a sacrifice made in the path of God, and condemns Yazid as being bereft of divine love. Turkish Sufi Yunus Emre labels Husayn, along with his brother Hasan, as the "fountain head of the martyrs" and "Kings of the Paradise" in his songs.

See also

 Abd al-Rahman ibn Abd Rabb al-Ansari al-Khazraji
 Al-Hannanah mosque
 List of casualties in Husayn's army at the Battle of Karbala
 Mokhtarnameh
 Anti-Shi'ism
 The Hussaini Encyclopedia
 Muawiya, Hassan and Hussein (TV series)

Notes

References

Bibliography

External links

 Battle of Karbalāʾ, Encyclopædia Britannica
 List of the casualties of Karbla

Sunni links
Karbala – A Lesson For Mankind

Shi'a links
Events of Karbala
Ashura.com
Poetryofislam.com, poetry on Kerbala by Mahmood Abu Shahbaaz Londoni
Sacred-texts.com, Battle of Karbala 
Battle of Karbala
A Probe Into the History of Ashura by Dr. Ibrahim Ayati

 
Conflicts in 680
Iraq under the Umayyad Caliphate
Battles involving the Umayyad Caliphate
Battle of Karbala
Shia Islam
Last stands